Stefano Rossoni (born 14 January 1997) is an Italian professional footballer who plays as a right back for  club Vis Pesaro.

Club career
Born in Cattolica, Rossoni started his career in Vis Pesaro, and was promoted to the first team in 2013. He played six seasons for the club.

On 1 August 2019, he joined Serie C club Carpi.

On 17 September 2020, he signed for Fermana.

On 21 July 2022, Rossoni returned to Vis Pesaro on a two-year contract.

References

External links
 
 

1997 births
Living people
Sportspeople from the Province of Rimini
Footballers from Emilia-Romagna
Italian footballers
Association football defenders
Serie C players
Serie D players
Vis Pesaro dal 1898 players
A.C. Carpi players
Fermana F.C. players